The St. Paul Civic Center was an indoor arena located in Saint Paul, Minnesota. The arena opened in 1973 and was closed and demolished in 1998. It once sat near the Ordway Music Theater and the Roy Wilkins Auditorium. The Xcel Energy Center was built on the former site of the arena.

History
The arena opened on January 1, 1973, and had seating capacity of approximately 16,000 for hockey. The arena could be expanded up to 17,800 for concerts and other non-sporting events. The Civic Center was the home of both iterations of the Minnesota Fighting Saints of the WHA—the first from 1973 to 1976 and the second from 1976 to 1977. The boys' state high school hockey and basketball tournaments were also held at the Civic Center as well as three NCAA Frozen Four national ice hockey championships. The arena was also the home of Verne Gagne's American Wrestling Association (AWA).

The arena was unique in North America in that the hockey dasher boards were made of clear acrylic glass from the shelf all the way down to the ice. This was because the arena's seating configuration was round, and the closest seats between the blue lines were not flush against the boards.

Previously not an issue when dasher board advertising was rare, the clear boards made for better sightlines for most spectators seated between the blue lines, since the seating angles in the Civic Center were shallow.  When the Minnesota Moose of the International Hockey League played their two seasons, they were replaced with standard white opaque boards to allow advertising. The new boards were disadvantageous to the previous seating arrangements, and with the Moose's quick departure to Winnipeg, showed the arena was outdated for the state's most popular sport only 21 years after opening, much less National Hockey League standards.

Popular culture
On June 28, 1984, Bruce Springsteen and The E Street Band, actress Courteney Cox and 200 extras filmed the Brian De Palma-directed  music video for "Dancing in the Dark" at the arena, one day before Springsteen's 1984 Born in the U.S.A. Tour formally opened at the arena.

The song "I Bought a Headache" from The Replacements' album Sorry Ma, Forgot to Take Out the Trash is about regretting purchasing an $8.50 ticket to a rock concert that is so loud it makes his head hurt. Billy Joel recorded and released a live version of his song, "Streetlife Serenader". The song was recorded from a 1980 concert held at the arena.

Noted performers

ABBA
Aerosmith
Bad Company
Barry Manilow
Bee Gees
Billy Joel
Billy Squier
Blue Öyster Cult
Bob Dylan
Boston
Bruce Springsteen
The Clash
Alice Cooper
David Bowie
Debbie Gibson
Dinosaur Jr.
The Doobie Brothers
Duran Duran
Electric Light Orchestra
Elton John
Elvis Presley 
Eric Clapton
Foghat
Foreigner
Grateful Dead
The Guess Who
The Jackson 5
Jethro Tull
John Denver
Judas Priest
Kiss
Led Zeppelin
Luciano Pavarotti
Lynyrd Skynyrd
Madonna
Neil Young
Wings
Peter Frampton
Phish
Prince
Queen
The Ramones
The Rolling Stones
Rush
Shaun Cassidy
Stevie Wonder
Styx
Ted Nugent
Tim McGraw
U2
Van Halen
The Who
ZZ Top
The Kinks

References

American Wrestling Association
College ice hockey venues in the United States
Defunct college ice hockey venues in the United States
Defunct indoor arenas in the United States
Indoor ice hockey venues in Saint Paul, Minnesota
Minnesota Fighting Saints
Music venues in Minnesota
Sports venues in Saint Paul, Minnesota
World Hockey Association venues
Demolished sports venues in Minnesota
Indoor arenas in Minnesota
1973 establishments in Minnesota
Sports venues demolished in 1998